Kieran McGeeney (born 18 October 1971) is an Irish Gaelic football manager and former player, who currently manages his native county, having previously managed the senior Kildare county team from 2007 until 2013.

McGeeney played football with his local club Mullaghbawn Cúchullain's in Armagh and also for Na Fianna club in Dublin. He was a member of the Armagh senior football team from 1992 until 2007, captaining the county to the 2002 All-Ireland Senior Football Championship, their first and only title.

Playing career

Club
Born at Mullaghbawn, County Armagh, McGeeney was a member of Mullaghbawn's 1995 Armagh Senior Football Championship and Ulster Senior Club Football Championship winning side. He later moved to Na Fianna on the northside of Dublin. With them he won the 1999 Leinster Senior Club Football Championship and three Dublin Senior Football Championships.

Inter-county
McGeeney captained Armagh to a first All-Ireland SFC title in the team's history in 2002.

He won three All Stars Awards (1999, 2000 and 2002) and six Ulster Senior Football Championship medals (1999, 2000, 2002, 2004, 2005, 2006).

He also received the 2002 Texaco Footballer of the Year award.

International rules
McGeeney represented Ireland on a number of occasions against Australia, captaining his country in the 2006 International Rules Series. He led the Irish team who faced Australia in the first test at Pearse Stadium and in the second test at Croke Park. He has currently made twelve appearances for his country, making his debut back in 1998.

Managerial career
McGeeney managed the Kildare senior football team from 2007 until 2013. He was appointed shortly after retiring as an inter-county player.

He led the county to a Leinster final appearance in 2009. The team also reached the 2010 All-Ireland SFC semi-final in 2010, losing narrowly to Down. In 2013, McGeeney managed the Kildare under-21 team to the Leinster Under-21 Football Championship title.

On 15 July 2012, Seánie Johnston made his debut for Kildare in an All-Ireland SFC qualifier against his native Cavan, coming on as a substitute late in the second half and scoring Kildare's final point of the match. The substitution was regarded by many as a genius managerial move by McGeeney whose team were only winning by 16 points at the time. Some commentators recognise this move as the starting point for McGeeney's managerial career which so far includes one under 21 Leinster title. Johnston went on to have an average football career.

He was axed after losing a ballot by county delegates by one vote, 29 to 28 in September 2013.

In October 2013, McGeeney joined the management team of the Armagh senior football team under Paul Grimley.

In November 2013, it was announced that McGeeney would be involved with the Tipperary hurling team for 2014 as a member of the back room team.

McGeeney took over from Paul Grimley as manager of his native Armagh in 2015.

Personal life
He is fond of the MMA fighting. He is also into his jiu jitsu.

According to Peter Queally in November 2021: "Kieran McGeeney, this Armagh [Gaelic] footballer, was training there [at the Straight Blast Gym in Dublin] at the time and he was good at jiu jitsu. At the end of the night I was wrecked and ready to pack up and John [Kavanagh, Straight Blast Gym founder] said get back on the mat and points at McGeeney. I'll never forget that 10 minutes. It was the most horrific 10 minutes of my life. I cannot describe to you how bad it was. There's one thing I can vividly remember. Kieran was on top of me and I'm not messing, he started putting his hand underneath my rib cage and I am not messing, his hand was inside my body. He was pulling on my ribs. I thought I was going to break my ribs and I was going to tap, but I didn't. I couldn't bring myself to do it. I kind of knew what was going on, even though John didn't say anything, it felt like a big set-up". According to the BBC, "It was just that. Kavanagh had told Kieran McGeeney — a legend in the GAA world — to 'torture' Queally, to see if he was serious about becoming an MMA fighter".

Honours
 In May 2020, the Irish Independent named McGeeney as one of the "dozens of brilliant players" who narrowly missed selection for its "Top 20 footballers in Ireland over the past 50 years".

References

1971 births
Living people
All-Ireland-winning captains (football)
All Stars Footballers of the Year
Armagh inter-county Gaelic footballers
Irish international rules football players
Mullaghbawn Gaelic footballers
Na Fianna Gaelic footballers
Tipperary county hurling team
Texaco Footballers of the Year
Winners of one All-Ireland medal (Gaelic football)